Laurin & Klement was a Czech automobile, motorcycle and bicycle manufacturing company founded in 1895 in Mladá Boleslav, Kingdom of Bohemia by automotive pioneers Václav Laurin and Václav Klement. Car production commenced in 1905, and the company soon became the largest car manufacturer in Austria-Hungary. It was acquired by industrial conglomerate Škoda Works in 1925 and re-branded as Škoda Auto, which is today the largest car manufacturer in the Czech Republic and a part of the Volkswagen Group.

History
The company was founded in 1895 and engaged in the production of new bicycles as well as doing repairs, their first bicycles being called Slavia. The company was named after its two founders: Václav Laurin (born 27 September 1865, died 4 December 1930), and Václav Klement (born 16 October 1868, died 13 August 1938).

Car production commenced in 1905, and the company soon became the largest car manufacturer in Austria-Hungary.  In 1925 the company was acquired by the Škoda Works, and operated henceforth under the brand Škoda Auto (Škoda).

Today, the Laurin & Klement name is used by Škoda Auto to distinguish especially luxurious editions of some of their car models (Yeti, Octavia, Superb and Kodiaq).

Models 

Laurin & Klement A (1905)
Laurin & Klement B (1906)
Laurin & Klement C (1906)
Laurin & Klement E (1906)
Laurin & Klement B2 (1907)
Laurin & Klement C2 (1907)
Laurin & Klement FC (1907) (racing car)
Laurin & Klement FCS (1908) (racing car)
Laurin & Klement BS (1908)
Laurin & Klement EN (1909)
Laurin & Klement FCR (1909) (racing car)
Laurin & Klement ENS (1910)
Laurin & Klement T / Ta (1914)
Laurin & Klement MK6 (Laurin & Klement MK6 / 445 / 450) (1920)
Laurin & Klement A (1922) (Laurin & Klement A / 100) (1922)
Laurin & Klement 105 (1923)
Laurin & Klement 150 (1923)
Laurin & Klement 350 (1925)
Laurin & Klement 110 (1925)
Laurin & Klement 120 (1925)
Škoda 360 (Laurin & Klement 360) (1926)

See also
List of motorcycles of 1900 to 1909

References

External links

 Biography of company founders (in Czech)
 Brief history with many model images (in Czech)

Cycle manufacturers of the Czech Republic
Motor vehicle manufacturers of Austria-Hungary
Motor vehicle manufacturers of Czechoslovakia
Motorcycle manufacturers of Czechoslovakia
Škoda
Vintage vehicles
Vehicle manufacturing companies established in 1895
Conglomerate companies established in 1925
1895 establishments in Austria-Hungary
1925 establishments in Czechoslovakia
Defunct manufacturing companies of Czechoslovakia